Clay Yarborough (born February 6, 1981) is an American politician who has served in the Florida Senate from the 4th district since 2022. He previously served in the Florida House of Representatives from the 12th district from 2016 to 2022, and on the Jacksonville City Council from the 1st district from 2007 to 2015.

References

1981 births
Living people
Republican Party members of the Florida House of Representatives
Republican Party Florida state senators
21st-century American politicians